The 2015 Baylor Bears baseball team will represent Baylor University during the 2015 NCAA Division I baseball season. The Bears will play their home games at Baylor Ballpark as a member of the Big 12 Conference. They will be led by head coach Steve Smith, in his 21st season at Baylor.

Previous season
In 2014, the Bears finished the season 7th in the Big 12 with a record of 26–31, 8–15 in conference play. They qualified for the 2014 Big 12 Conference baseball tournament and were eliminated in the semifinals. They failed to qualify for the 2014 NCAA Division I baseball tournament.

Personnel

Roster

Coaching staff

Season

February
In game 1, the Mustangs outhit the Bears 12–7, but Baylor won 8–6. In the second game of the series, the Bears also won by a score of 8–6, and closed out the series sweep with a 6–0 win in the series finale. Baylor moved into the Collegiate Baseball Newspaper poll at #21 nationally following the Cal Poly sweep. Playing as the #21 team in the country, Baylor went 2–2 over the next week. On February 21, the Bears swept the Golden Flashes in a doubleheader, winning the two games by a combined score of 10–4.

For the final week of February (and the first day of March), the Bears fell to #25 nationally in the Collegiate Baseball poll and were also ranked number 28 in the NCBWA poll. On February 25, the Bears defeated  in a game that had been pushed back one day due to inclement weather. Starter Theron Kay allowed no runs over five innings pitched. On the weekend of February 27, the Bears travelled to Fullerton, California to face Cal State Fullerton, a team that had been ranked in the national polls in the early portion of the season. The Bears were swept over a 3-game series by the Titans, one in which Bears pitching allowed 28 runs.

Schedule

! style="background:#003015;color:white;"| Regular Season
|- valign="top" 

|- bgcolor="#bbffbb"
| February 13 || #13  ||  || Baylor Ballpark • Waco, TX || W 8–6 || Lewis (1–0) || Zandona (0–1) || Spicer (1) || 2,834 || 1–0 || –
|- bgcolor="#bbffbb"
| February 14 || #13 Cal Poly ||  || Baylor Ballpark • Waco, TX || W 8–6 || Kirkland (1–0) || Smith (0–1) || Spicer (2) || 2,835 || 2–0 || –
|- bgcolor="#bbffbb"
| February 15 || #13 Cal Poly ||  || Baylor Ballpark • Waco, TX || W 6–0 || Kay (1–0) || Calomeni (0–1) || Castano (1) || 2,380 || 3–0 || –
|- bgcolor="#ffbbbb"
| February 17 ||  || #21 || Baylor Ballpark • Waco, TX || L 6–9 || Adams (2–0) || Montemayor (0–1) || Koch (1) || 2,052 || 3–1 || –
|- bgcolor="#ffbbbb"
| February 20 ||  || #21 || Baylor Ballpark • Waco, TX || L 3–11 || Jensen-Clagg (1–1) || Castano (0–1) ||  || 2,220 || 3–2 || –
|- bgcolor="#bbffbb"
| February 21 || Kent State || #21 || Baylor Ballpark • Waco, TX || W 6–1 || Kirkland (2–0) || Skolnicki (1–1) ||  || 2,189 || 4–2 || –
|- bgcolor="#bbffbb"
| February 21 || Kent State || #21 || Baylor Ballpark • Waco, TX || W 4–3 (10) || Spicer (1–0) || Pierce (0–1) ||  || 2,986 || 5–2 || –
|- bgcolor="#bbbbbb"
| February 24 ||  ||  || Baylor Ballpark • Waco, TX || colspan=7| Cancelled 
|- bgcolor="#bbffbb"
| February 25 || Northwestern State || #25 || Baylor Ballpark • Waco, TX || W 8–4 || Kay (2–0) || Tidwell (0–2) ||  || 1,854 || 6–2 || –
|- bgcolor="#ffbbbb"
| February 27 || at Cal State Fullerton || #25 || Goodwin Field • Fullerton, CA || L 1–10 || Eshelman (1–2) || Tolson (0–1) ||  || 1,422 || 6–3 || –
|- bgcolor="#ffbbbb"
| February 28 || at Cal State Fullerton || #25 || Goodwin Field • Fullerton, CA || L 6–11 || Seabold (1–0) || Kirkland (2–1) ||  || 1,422 || 6–4 || –
|-

|- bgcolor="#ffbbbb"
| March 1 || at Cal State Fullerton || #25 || Goodwin Field • Fullerton, CA || L 6–7 || Kuhl (1–0) || Montemayor (0–2) || Peitzmeier (3) || 1,184 || 6–5 || –
|- bgcolor="#bbbbbb"
| March 4 ||  ||  || Baylor Ballpark • Waco, TX || colspan=7| Postponed Rescheduled for March 18
|- bgcolor="#ffbbbb"
| March 6 || vs.  ||  || Minute Maid Park • Houston, TX || L 1–2 || Brewster (3–1) || Tolson (0–2) || Culp (3) || 503 || 6–6 || –
|- bgcolor="#ffbbbb"
| March 7 || vs. #3 LSU ||  || Minute Maid Park • Houston, TX || L 0–2 || Lange (4–0) || Castano (0–2) || Stallings (7) || 3,343 || 6–7 || –
|- bgcolor="#ffbbbb"
| March 8 || vs. #11  ||  || Minute Maid Park • Houston, TX || L 2–3 || Kent (4–0) || Stone (0–1) || Hendrix (4) || 4,589 || 6–8 || –
|- bgcolor="#ffbbbb"
| March 10 || at Dallas Baptist ||  || Horner Ballpark • Houston, TX || L 3–17 || Smith (2–1) || Kay (2–1) ||  || 1,102 || 6–9 || –
|- bgcolor="#ffbbbb"
| March 13 || at #1 TCU ||  || Lupton Stadium • Fort Worth, TX || L 1–3 || Traver (3–0) || Tolson (0–3) || Ferrell (6) || 4,018 || 6–10 || 0–1
|- bgcolor="#ffbbbb"
| March 14 || at #1 TCU ||  || Lupton Stadium • Fort Worth, TX || L 2–3 || Morrison (4–0) || Castano (0–3) || Ferrell (7) || 4,259 || 6–11 || 0–2
|- bgcolor="#ffbbbb"
| March 15 || at #1 TCU ||  || Lupton Stadium • Fort Worth, TX || L 1–10 || Young (4–0) || Stone (0–2) ||  || 4,323 || 6–12 || 0–3
|- bgcolor="#bbffbb"
| March 17 || at Sam Houston State ||  || Don Sanders Stadium • Huntsville, TX || W 4–3 (10) || Castano (1–3) || Church (0–1) ||  || 1,729 || 7–12 || –
|- bgcolor="#ffbbbb"
| March 18 || Sam Houston State ||  || Baylor Ballpark • Waco, TX || L 3–4 || Ebbs (3–1) || Tolson (0–4) || Odom (1) || 1,789 || 7–13 || –
|- bgcolor="#bbffbb"
| March 20 || West Virginia ||  || Baylor Ballpark • Waco, TX || W 5–4 || Kirkland (3–1) || Dotson (0–2) || Spicer (3) || 1,906 || 8–13 || 1–3
|- bgcolor="#bbffbb"
| March 21 || West Virginia ||  || Baylor Ballpark • Waco, TX || W 10–4 || Hessemer (1–0) || Vance (2–2) ||  || 2,239 || 9–13 || 2–3
|- bgcolor="#ffbbbb"
| March 22 || West Virginia ||  || Baylor Ballpark • Waco, TX || L 2–8 || Donato (3–3) || Tolson (0–5) ||  || 2,172 || 9–14 || 2–4
|- bgcolor="#bbffbb"
| March 24 || at  ||  || Clay Gould Ballpark • Arlington, TX || W 6–2 || Kay (3–1) || Laberge (1–3) ||  || 480 || 10–14 || – 
|- bgcolor="#bbffbb"
| March 27 || Oklahoma ||  || Baylor Ballpark • Waco, TX || W 3–0 || Castano (2–3) || Elliott (3–3) ||  || 2,495 || 11–14 || 3–4
|- bgcolor="#bbffbb"
| March 28 || Oklahoma ||  || Baylor Ballpark • Waco, TX || W 7–2 || Tolson (1–5) || Hansen (3–3) ||  || 3,446 || 12–14 || 4–4
|- bgcolor="#ffbbbb"
| March 29 || Oklahoma ||  || Baylor Ballpark • Waco, TX || L 3–13 || Tasin (5–1) || Hessemer (1–1) ||  || 2,435 || 12–15 || 4–5
|- bgcolor="#ffbbbb"
| March 31 || #14 Houston ||  || Baylor Ballpark • Waco, TX || L 0–11 || Longville (2–2) || Kay (3–2) ||  || 2,104 || 12–16 || –
|-

|- bgcolor="#ffbbbb"
| April 2 || at  ||  || Bobcat Ballpark • San Marcos, TX || L 8–9 (10) || Powell (2–3) || Spicer (1–1) ||  || 1,808 || 12–17 || –
|- bgcolor="#ffbbbb"
| April 3 || Texas State ||  || Baylor Ballpark • Waco, TX || L 0–5 || Grist (2–2) || Tolson (1–6) ||  || 2,157 || 12–18 || –
|- bgcolor="#ffbbbb"
| April 4 || Texas State ||  || Baylor Ballpark • Waco, TX || L 1–4 || Hallonquist (2–1) || Kay (3–3) ||  || 2,539 || 12–19 || –
|- bgcolor="#bbffbb"
| April 7 || Texas–Arlington ||  || Baylor Ballpark • Waco, TX || W 10–7 || Hessemer (2–1) || Hobbs (1–2) || Spicer (4) || 2,224 || 13–19 || –
|- bgcolor="#ffbbbb"
| April 10 || at Texas Tech ||  || Rip Griffin Park • Lubbock, TX || L 4–8 || Moseley (3–3) || Castano (2–4) ||  || 3,974 || 13–20 || 4–6
|- bgcolor="#ffbbbb"
| April 11 || at Texas Tech ||  || Rip Griffin Park • Lubbock, TX || L 2–3 (12) || Moreno (2–3) || Montemayor (0–3) ||  || 4,387 || 13–21 || 4–7
|- bgcolor="#ffbbbb"
| April 12 || at Texas Tech ||  || Rip Griffin Park • Lubbock, TX || L 5–9 || Damron (3–2) || Lewis (1–1) ||  || 3,573 || 13–22 || 4–8
|- align="center" bgcolor=""
| April 14 ||  ||  || Baylor Ballpark • Waco, TX ||  ||  ||  ||  ||  ||  ||
|- align="center" bgcolor=""
| April 17 || at Oklahoma State ||  || Allie P. Reynolds Stadium • Stillwater, OK ||  ||  ||  ||  ||  ||  ||
|- align="center" bgcolor=""
| April 18 || at Oklahoma State ||  || Allie P. Reynolds Stadium • Stillwater, OK ||  ||  ||  ||  ||  ||  ||
|- align="center" bgcolor=""
| April 19 || at Oklahoma State ||  || Allie P. Reynolds Stadium • Stillwater, OK ||  ||  ||  ||  ||  ||  ||
|- align="center" bgcolor=""
| April 21 || Lamar ||  || Baylor Ballpark • Waco, TX ||  ||  ||  ||  ||  ||  ||
|- align="center" bgcolor=""
| April 24 || Kansas State ||  || Baylor Ballpark • Waco, TX ||  ||  ||  ||  ||  ||  ||
|- align="center" bgcolor=""
| April 25 || Kansas State ||  || Baylor Ballpark • Waco, TX ||  ||  ||  ||  ||  ||  ||
|- align="center" bgcolor=""
| April 26 || Kansas State ||  || Baylor Ballpark • Waco, TX ||  ||  ||  ||  ||  ||  ||
|- align="center" bgcolor=""
| April 28 || at  ||  || Roadrunner Field • San Antonio, TX ||  ||  ||  ||  ||  ||  ||
|-

|- align="center" bgcolor=""
| May 1 || at Kansas ||  || Hoglund Ballpark • Lawrence, KS ||  ||  ||  ||  ||  ||  ||
|- align="center" bgcolor=""
| May 2 || at Kansas ||  || Hoglund Ballpark • Lawrence, KS ||  ||  ||  ||  ||  ||  ||
|- align="center" bgcolor=""
| May 3 || at Kansas ||  || Hoglund Ballpark • Lawrence, KS ||  ||  ||  ||  ||  ||  ||
|- align="center" bgcolor=""
| May 12 || UTSA ||  || Baylor Ballpark • Waco, TX ||  ||  ||  ||  ||  ||  ||
|- align="center" bgcolor=""
| May 16 || Texas ||  || Baylor Ballpark • Waco, TX ||  ||  ||  ||  ||  ||  ||
|- align="center" bgcolor=""
| May 17 || Texas ||  || Baylor Ballpark • Waco, TX ||  ||  ||  ||  ||  ||  ||
|- align="center" bgcolor=""
| May 17 || Texas ||  || Baylor Ballpark • Waco, TX ||  ||  ||  ||  ||  ||  ||
|-

|- 
! style="background:#003015;color:white;"| Post-Season
|-

|- align="center"
|  || TBD || || ONEOK Field • Tulsa, OK ||  ||  ||  ||  ||  ||  || 
|- align="center"
|  || TBD || || ONEOK Field • Tulsa, OK ||  ||  ||  ||  ||  ||  || 
|-

|-
| style="font-size:88%" | All rankings from Collegiate Baseball.

Rankings

References

Baylor Bears
Baylor Bears baseball seasons